The 1975 CFL Draft composed of eight rounds where 81 Canadian football players were chosen from eligible Canadian universities and Canadian players playing in the NCAA. A total of 16 players were selected as territorial exemptions, with the Montreal Alouettes being the only team to make no picks during this stage of the draft. Through a trade with the Calgary Stampeders, the Winnipeg Blue Bombers selected first overall in the draft. They would not choose first overall again until the 2011 CFL Draft.

Territorial exemptions
Calgary Stampeders                           Doug Carlson  DB  Colorado

Calgary Stampeders  Lloyd Fairbanks  G  Brigham Young

Toronto Argonauts  Paul Gilson  DT  Guelph

Toronto Argonauts                                Neil Mairs  TB  Otterbein

Winnipeg Blue Bombers                        Mel Barclay  DE  Manitoba

Winnipeg Blue Bombers                            Doug MacIver                    DT                Manitoba

British Columbia Lions                       Barry Houlihan  TB  Simon Fraser

British Columbia Lions  Mark McDonald  WR  Washington State

Hamilton Tiger-Cats                          Nick Bastaja                   G                 Simon Fraser

Hamilton Tiger-Cats                              Angelo Santucci  TB  Saint Mary's

Saskatchewan Roughriders                     Ron Moen  LB  Saskatchewan

Saskatchewan Roughriders                         Larry Remmen                  TB                 Saskatchewan

Ottawa Rough Riders                           Peter Stenerson  QB  Carleton

Ottawa Rough Riders  Jeff Turcotte                 DT                 Colorado

Edmonton Eskimos                             Pete Lavorato  DB  Utah State

Edmonton Eskimos  Tom Towns  LB  Alberta

1st round
1. Winnipeg Blue Bombers  Steve Scully  T  Syracuse

2. Toronto Argonauts                             Allan Charuk  WR  Acadia

3. Hamilton Tiger-Cats                           Gerald Kunyk                  QB          Alberta

4. Winnipeg Blue Bombers  Don Bowman  DB  Western Ontario

5. Hamilton Tiger-Cats  Sean Sullivan                 TB          Simon Fraser

6. Hamilton Tiger-Cats                           Krys Kasprzyk  DT  Wooster

7. Ottawa Rough Riders                           Marvin Allemang               LB          Acadia

8. Winnipeg Blue Bombers                         Bernard Ruoff                 K           Syracuse

9. Montreal Alouettes  Bill Simmons  DB  New Brunswick

2nd round
10. Calgary Stampeders                           Maurice Charbonneau  T  McMaster

11. Edmonton Eskimos  John Martin                   DE           Carleton

12. Saskatchewan Roughriders                     Phil Monckton                 TE           Western Ontario

13. Ottawa Rough Riders  Dave Patterson                LB           Simon Fraser

14. Calgary Stampeders                           Greg Warkentin                E            Simon Fraser

15. Saskatchewan Roughriders                     Wade Clare  TB  Loyola

16. Ottawa Rough Riders  Jim Baker                     C            Alberta

17. Edmonton Eskimos                             Bob Gillies  G  Bishop's

18. Saskatchewan Roughriders  Bill Evans                    LB           Alberta

3rd round
19. Calgary Stampeders                           Rick Finseth  QB  Pacific Lutheran

20. British Columbia Lions  Mike Harrington               DB           Saskatchewan

21. Winnipeg Blue Bombers                        Mike Munzar                   QB           Bishop's

22. Saskatchewan Roughriders  Alex Morris  DB  Queen's

23. British Columbia Lions  Peter Walker  T  Wilfrid Laurier

24. Saskatchewan Roughriders                     Bob Woloschuk                 TB           McMaster

25. Ottawa Rough Riders                          Cliff Summers                 LB           Western Ontario

26. Edmonton Eskimos                             Curt Rush                     WR           Western Ontario

27. Winnipeg Blue Bombers  Alex Morris                   DB           Queen's

4th round
28. Calgary Stampeders                           Rick Fenseth                  QB           Pacific Lutheran

29. Toronto Argonauts                            Doug Brandt  DB  Winona State

30. Winnipeg Blue Bombers                        Kevin Spink                   C            Western Ontario

31. British Columbia Lions                       Randy Ragon  K  U.S. International

32. Hamilton Tiger-Cats                          Libert Castillo  TB  Toronto

33. Saskatchewan Roughriders                     Carl Thoma                    G             Saskatchewan

34. Ottawa Rough Riders                           Grant Stephenson              LB            Saint Mary's

35. Edmonton Eskimos                             John Latter                   T             Bishop's

5th round
36. Calgary Stampeders                           Richard Pederson              T             Wilfrid Laurier

37. Toronto Argonauts                            Don Cornwell                  LB            Guelph

38. Winnipeg Blue Bombers  Dave Pearson                  DB            Manitoba

39. British Columbia Lions                       Warren Howe                   WR            Western Ontario

40. Hamilton Tiger-Cats                          Brian Pienderleith  WR  Windsor

41. Saskatchewan Roughriders                     Brent Schwartz                LB            Manitoba

42. Ottawa Rough Riders  Scott Gibson                  G             Manitoba

43. Edmonton Eskimos                             Barrie Fraser                QB             Saskatchewan

6th round
44. Calgary Stampeders                           Rick Krahn  LB  Delta State

45. Toronto Argonauts                            Ed Dietrich                  DE             Wilfrid Laurier

46. Winnipeg Blue Bombers                        Wayne Wagner                 FB             Manitoba

47. British Columbia Lions                       Paul Barchiesi               DT             Western Ontario

48. Hamilton Tiger-Cats  Ian Anderson                 LB             Queen's

49. Saskatchewan Roughriders  Alan Cameron                 T              Colorado

50. Ottawa Rough Riders                          Arunas Pleckaitis            TE             Carleton

51. Edmonton Eskimos                             Warren Kiland  T  Hawaii

52. Edmonton Eskimos                             Ken Luchkow                  DE             Alberta

7th round
53. Calgary Stampeders                           Doug Senik                   DE             Alberta

54. Winnipeg Blue Bombers  Dave Pearson                 DB             Manitoba

55. British Columbia Lions                       Don McLellan                 LB             Simon Fraser

56. Hamilton Tiger-Cats                          Warren Howe                  WR             Western Ontario

57. Saskatchewan Roughriders                     Marv Messner  DE  North Dakota

58. Ottawa Rough Riders                          Roy Biljetina                TE             Wooster

59. Edmonton Eskimos                             Marty Doyle                  T              Carleton

60. Edmonton Eskimos  Greg Anderson                TE             Queen's

8th round
61. Calgary Stampeders                           Art Niederbuhl               DB             Loyola

62. Winnipeg Blue Bombers                        Peter Sabiston               G              Queen's

63. British Columbia Lions  Doug Murray                  T              Bishop's

64. Hamilton Tiger-Cats                          Bob Heartwell                HB             Western Ontario

65. Hamilton Tiger-Cats                          Richard Chalupka             TB             Wilfrid Laurier

References
Canadian Draft

Canadian College Draft
Cfl Draft, 1975